Kurt Heinrich Sethe (30 September 1869 – 6 July 1934) was a noted German Egyptologist and philologist from Berlin. He was a student of Adolf Erman. Sethe collected numerous texts from Egypt during his visits there and edited the Urkunden des ægyptischen Altertums which is a standard catalogue of Ancient Egyptian literature and text.

Career 
Among Sethe's many contributions to Egyptology, two are singled out by Gardiner (p. 433): "...the pronunciation of Middle Egyptian... The chief authorities to be consulted are Sethe's great work on the Egyptian verb, and a much later brilliant article entitled Die Vokalisation des Ägyptischen in Zeitschrift der deutschen morgenländischen Gesellschaft"" (1923). Actually, Sethe was the first one to put forth a systematic theory of the Egyptian verb; it was no easy accomplishment, since the inflection of the Egyptian verb was done mainly by changing the vowels, and the Egyptians only wrote consonants.

Among Sethe's students were Hans Jakob Polotsky and Alan Gardiner. Sethe's anthology, Aegyptische Lesestuecke, is still used by some beginners in the study of the language. Sethe also published a comprehensive collection of Egyptian epigraphy, which he called Urkunden der Aegyptologie.

References
 Kurt Sethe: Das aegyptische verbum im altaegyptischen, neuaegyptischen und koptischen, Leipzig: J. C. Hinrichs, 1902.
 Kurt Sethe: Urkunden des Alten Reichs (= Urkunden des ägyptischen Altertums. Abteilung 1). 1. Band, 4. Heft. 2., augmented edition, Hinrichs'sche Buchhandlung, Leipzig 1933, available online.
 at 2terres.hautesavoie.net
Gardiner, Alan. Egyptian Grammar. Being an Introduction to the Study of Hieroglyphs. 3rd Ed., Rev. London: Oxford University Press, 1957 (1st ed. 1927).

1869 births
1934 deaths
German Egyptologists
German lexicographers
Members of the Prussian Academy of Sciences
Archaeologists from Berlin
People from the Province of Brandenburg
University of Tübingen alumni
Humboldt University of Berlin alumni
Academic staff of the Humboldt University of Berlin
Academic staff of the University of Göttingen
Members of the Bavarian Academy of Sciences
German male non-fiction writers